Chase Andrew Cole Holbrook (born September 27, 1985) is an American football coach and former starting quarterback for New Mexico State University from 2006 to 2008. He is currently an offensive analyst at Colorado State. He was previously the quarterbacks coach for the New Mexico State University Aggies football team. Holbrook played his freshman collegiate year at Southeastern Louisiana as a backup quarterback in 2004.

Early life
Holbrook attended L. D. Bell High School in Hurst, Texas. While at Bell, Holbrook was an option style quarterback. Due to his high school's offense, Holbrook was receiving scholarship offers from colleges that wanted him to play tight end.

College career
Holbrook received offers from Missouri, TCU and Tulsa, but turned down their offers at a chance to be a quarterback at Southeastern Louisiana. Holbrook appeared in 10 games as a true freshman for the Lions, completing 7 of 9 passes from 75 yards, in Hal Mumme's pass friendly offense. Following the 2004 season, Mumme took the head coaching job at New Mexico State, and Holbrook followed him still wanting to play quarterback. Holbrook sat out the 2005 season due to NCAA transfer rules. Holbrook was named the starting quarterback for the Aggies the following fall. During his collegiate career Holbrook played a total of 44 games, completing 1,093 of 1,575 attempts for a total of 11,921 yards with 85 touchdowns and 41 interceptions.  In his first year at NMSU he threw for 4,619 yards and had 4,541 yards of total offense, setting an NCAA single-season record.  That same season he scored 34 touchdowns with only 9 interceptions, breaking many of the school's single-season records in the process.

College career statistics

Professional career
Holbrook received a tryout with the Dallas Cowboys after going undrafted in 2009.

Coaching career

McMurry
In 2009, Holbrook followed coach Mumme to McMurry University, where he was named the running backs coach. After two seasons as the running backs coach, Holbrook was named quarterbacks coach in 2011. Holbrook added offensive coordinator to his duties in 2013.

New Mexico Highlands
Holbrook was named the offensive coordinator and quarterbacks coach at New Mexico Highlands University in 2014.

Tarleton State
In February 2015, Holbrook was hired as the passing game coordinator and quarterbacks coach for Tarleton State University.

Washington State
Holbrook spent the 2017 season as an offensive quality control coach on Mike Leach's staff at Washington State.

Return to New Mexico State
In 2018, Holbrook returned to New Mexico State as the tight ends coach on Doug Martin's staff. Prior to the 2019 season, Holbrook shifted to coaching quarterbacks, where he remained through the 2021 season.

Colorado State
In January 2022, Holbrook was announced as an offensive analyst at Colorado State working for head coach Jay Norvell.

References

External links
 New Mexico State coach profile
 New Mexico Highlands profile
 New Mexico State player profile

1985 births
Living people
American football quarterbacks
McMurry War Hawks football coaches
New Mexico Highlands Cowboys football coaches
New Mexico State Aggies football coaches
New Mexico State Aggies football players
Southeastern Louisiana Lions football players
Tarleton State Texans football coaches
Washington State Cougars football coaches
People from Hurst, Texas
Sportspeople from Lubbock, Texas
Coaches of American football from Texas
Players of American football from Texas